Milliy Firqa (ملی فرقا - National Party, Cyrillic: Милли фирка) was a Muslim political group in Crimea, which transferred en masse to the Bolsheviks during the Russian Civil War. Noman Çelebicihan, Asan Sabri Ayvazov, and Cafer Seydamet Qırımer established the group in 1917. At the time, they eventually seized control of the state in an attempt to foster a Crimean Tatar identity. Soviet authorities banned the party in 1921.

References

Crimean People's Republic
Crimean Tatar culture
Political parties in Crimea
Political parties of the Russian Revolution
Crimean Tatar organizations